The Hundred of Ridley is a cadastral hundred in the County of Russell in South Australia. It was proclaimed on 19 April 1860 and included a portion of the former Hundred of the Murray.

References

Ridley